Sant Kabir Nagar district is one of the 75 districts of Uttar Pradesh state in northern India. Khalilabad is the district headquarters. Sant Kabir Nagar district is a part of Basti division.

Economy
In 2007 the Ministry of Panchayati Raj named Sant Kabir Nagar one of the country's 250 most backward districts (out of a total of 640). It is one of the 34 districts in Uttar Pradesh currently receiving funds from the Backward Regions Grant Fund Programme (BRGF).

Demographics 

According to the 2011 census Sant Kabir Nagar district has a population of 1,715,183, roughly equal to the nation of The Gambia or the US state of Nebraska. This gives it a ranking of 283rd in India (out of a total of 640). 
Its population growth rate over the decade 2001-2011 was 20.71%. Sant Kabir Nagar has a sex ratio of 969 females for every 1000 males and a literacy rate of 69.01%. Scheduled Castes made up 21.52% of the population.

Language

At the time of the 2011 Census of India, 53.67% of the population in the district spoke Bhojpuri, 36.42% Hindi and 9.49% Urdu as their first language.

Bhojpuri is the native language of the district. The Bhojpuri variant of Kaithi is the indigenous script of Bhojpuri language.

Notable residents
 Sant Kabir Das, poet
 Bhalchandra Yadava, politician
Kurmi kshatriya Ram Prasad Chaudhary, politician 
Kurmi kshatriya kavindra Chaudhary, politician 
 Ankur Raj Tiwari, politician
 Sucheta Kripalani, First Woman Chief Minister Of India, MLA from Mehndawal(1962-1967)
 Akhilesh Pati Tripathi Politician in Delhi

References

External links

 Sant Kabir Nagar district website
 Sant Kabir Nagar District Court Website
 Sant Kabir Nagar census 2011 data

 
Districts of Uttar Pradesh